The Wessex Football League is an English association football league formed in 1986, with its premier division currently at the fifth step of the National League System, or the ninth tier of the overall English football league system. The participating clubs are mainly based in Hampshire and Dorset but the league also encompasses clubs from adjoining counties such as Wiltshire, Berkshire, and the Isle of Wight.

In 2004, it absorbed most of the clubs from its feeder league, the Hampshire League, which formed a new Division Two and Division Three. In 2006 the divisions were renamed as the Premier Division and Divisions One and Two. At the end of the 2006–07 season, Division Two was disbanded, and most of the clubs formed a new Hampshire Premier League.

Champions of the Wessex League who meet the relevant ground and financial requirements are eligible for promotion to the Southern League Division One South & West.

Past winners

In 2004, the league expanded to three divisions.

In 2006, the divisions were renumbered, with the top division being renamed the Premier Division.

In 2007, Division Two was discontinued.

Wessex League Cup
The Wessex League Cup, or 'Sydenhams League Cup' for sponsor purposes, is a domestic cup which all the Wessex League teams participate in.

Wessex League Cup winners

1986–87: Road Sea Southampton
1987–88: East Cowes Victoria Athletic
1988–89: A.F.C. Lymington
1989–90: A.F.C. Totton
1990–91: Thatcham Town
1991–92: Thatcham Town
1992–93: Gosport Borough
1993–94: Wimborne Town
1994–95: Thatcham Town
1995–96: Downton
1996–97: Thatcham Town
1997–98: Aerostructures Sports & Social
1998–99: Cowes Sports
1999–2000: Wimborne Town
2000–01: (no competition held)
2001–02: Andover
2002–03: A.F.C. Totton
2003–04: Winchester City
2004–05: Hamworthy United
2005–06: A.F.C. Totton
2006–07: Lymington Town
2007–08: Wimborne Town
2008–09: VT
2009–10: Bemerton Heath Harlequins
2010–11: Bournemouth
2011–12: Christchurch
2012–13: Alresford Town
2013–14: Alresford Town
2014–15: A.F.C. Portchester
2015–16: Team Solent
2016–17: Sholing
2017–18: A.F.C. Portchester
2018–19: Baffins Milton Rovers
2019–20: (not awarded)
2020–21: Hamworthy United
2021–22: Shaftesbury

External links

 
1986 establishments in England
9
Sports leagues established in 1986
Football in Berkshire
Football in Dorset
Football in Hampshire
Football in Wiltshire
Football on the Isle of Wight